Gilbert C. Ada Gymnasium is a multi-purpose sports indoor facility. It is one of the facilities that the Oleai Sports Complex contains. A major renovation project is ongoing to repair the building and is scheduled for completion in 2017.

Basketball

Basketball rounds and events are held here at weekly basis. Saipan was the host city for the 2009 Oceania Basketball Tournament.
For that reason the venue was the Gilbert C. Ada Gymnasium. Nonetheless, there was concern over the overall condition of the gym; there was need for ventilation, improved lighting, and other elements.

Tennis

Tennis is also frequently played at the indoor gym. Australian Table Tennis player Scott Houston toured schools in Saipan and taught children the basic fundamentals of Table Tennis in Ada Gym for four days.

Volleyball

New volleyballs were supplied from the NMSA for the gym so civilians could play Volleyball during the open hours. This made a momentous uplift to the sports equipment available.

References

Sports venues in the Northern Mariana Islands